Heydarabad (also Romanized as Ḩeydarābād and Heidar Abad) is a village in Salehan Rural District, in the Central District of Khomeyn County, Markazi Province, Iran. At the 2006 census, its population was 52, in 17 families.

References 

Populated places in Khomeyn County